Ługi may refer to:

Ługi, Lower Silesian Voivodeship (south-west Poland)
Ługi, Sieradz County in Łódź Voivodeship (central Poland)
Ługi, Zgierz County in Łódź Voivodeship (central Poland)
Ługi, Kielce County in Świętokrzyskie Voivodeship (south-central Poland)
Ługi, Opatów County in Świętokrzyskie Voivodeship (south-central Poland)
Ługi, Mława County in Masovian Voivodeship (east-central Poland)
Ługi, Zwoleń County in Masovian Voivodeship (east-central Poland)
Ługi, Słupca County in Greater Poland Voivodeship (west-central Poland)
Ługi, Śrem County in Greater Poland Voivodeship (west-central Poland)
Ługi, Złotów County in Greater Poland Voivodeship (west-central Poland)
Ługi, Nowa Sól County in Lubusz Voivodeship (west Poland)
Ługi, Strzelce-Drezdenko County in Lubusz Voivodeship (west Poland)
Ługi, Pomeranian Voivodeship (north Poland)